Coto 47 is a city in the province of Puntarenas, Costa Rica. The city is located near the Costa Rica-Panama border.

Education
There is one school in the city,  the Central Coto 47 School.

Transportation
The city is served by Coto 47 Airport, with domestic commercial flights to Golfito and San Jose on Sansa Airlines.

References

Populated places in Puntarenas Province